Cuzamá  Municipality (In the Yucatec Maya Language: “place to swallow water”) is one of the 106 municipalities in the Mexican state of Yucatán containing  (150.73 km2) of land and located roughly 45 km southeast of the city of Mérida.

History
It is unknown which chieftainship the area was under prior to the arrival of the Spanish. After the conquest the area became part of the encomienda system. As early as 1607, the encomienda of Cuzamá was shared with the encomendero of Homún. In 1710, the encomenderos were Alfonso de Aranda y Aguayo and Pedro de Mézquita.

Yucatán declared its independence from the Spanish Crown in 1821 and in 1825, the area was assigned to the Coastal region with its headquarters in Izamal Municipality. In 1846, it passed to the Homún Municipality and was reassigned again in 1870 to the Acanceh Municipality.  It was designated as its own municipality by 1925.

Governance
The municipal president is elected for a three-year term. The town council has four councilpersons, who serve as Secretary and councilors of monuments and heritage, public services, policing commissaries, and ecology.

The Municipal Council administers the business of the municipality. It is responsible for budgeting and expenditures and producing all required reports for all branches of the municipal administration. Annually it determines educational standards for schools.

The Police Commissioners ensure public order and safety. They are tasked with enforcing regulations, distributing materials and administering rulings of general compliance issued by the council.

Communities
The head of the municipality is Cuzamá, Yucatán.  The other populated areas of the municipality include Chunkanán, Eknakán, Nohchakán, and Yaxcucul. The significant populations are shown below:

Local festivals
Every year from 1 to 8 September is a celebration for the Nativity of the Virgin Mary.

Tourist attractions
 Church of the Holy Trinity, built in the sixteenth century
 Church of St. Francis of Assisi, built in the colonial era
 Archeological site at Chuncanan
 Archeological site at Eknacan
 Archeological site at Xculab
 Cenotes of Cuzamá: Bolonchojol, Chacsinicche, Chelentun 
 Hacienda Cuchbalam

References

Municipalities of Yucatán